NVP may refer to:

 Name–value pair
 Naphthylvinylpyridine, an acetylcholine antagonist
 National Vigilance Park, a former memorial to United States Cold War reconnaissance flights located in Fort Meade, Maryland.
 Nationale Volkspartei (National People's Party), a far-right political party in Austria
 Nausea and vomiting of pregnancy
 Network virtualization platform
 Network Voice Protocol
 Nevirapine, an antiretroviral drug (of the class NRTI) used to manage HIV/AIDS
 Newark Venture Partners, a venture capital fund
 Nickelodeon Valuable Player, the award given to the winner of fan voting for the top performer in an NFL on Nickelodeon broadcast, and an award for league-wide top performer given each week during an NFL Slimetime broadcast
 Nominal velocity of propagation, the speed with which electrical signals travels through various types of conductors
 Nonviolent Communication, an approach to communication based on principles of nonviolence
 N-version programming